Omertà is a code of behaviour usually associated with Italian Mafias.

Omerta may also refer to:

 Omerta (2008 film), a 2008 Cuban film
 Omerta (2017 film), a 2017 Indian film
 Omertà (comics) or Paulie Provenzano, a fictional character in the Marvel Comics universe
 Omertà (novel), a 2000 novel by Mario Puzo
 "Omertà" (Millennium), an episode of the American television series Millennium
 Omerta (TV series), a 1996 Quebec television series
 Omertà (2012 film), a feature film sequel to the series
 Omerta 6/12, a 2021 Finnish film

In videogames
 The Omertas, a faction in the 2010 video game Fallout: New Vegas
 Omerta (video game), a browser-based text MMORPG 
 Omerta – City of Gangsters, a management simulation and a turn-based tactical combat video game with a cover system and stealth action

Music
 "Omertà", a song by The Afghan Whigs from 1965
 "Omertà", a song by Lamb of God from Ashes of the Wake
 "Omerta", a song from Viva Emptiness by Katatonia
 "Omertà", a song from The Best in the World Pack by Drake
 Omertà (album), a 2012 album by Adrenaline Mob
 Omerta (Richie Beirach and Dave Liebman album), a 1978 album by Richard Beirach and David Leibman
 Omerta (band), an English indie rock band